Hordeivirus is a genus of viruses, in the family Virgaviridae. Plants serve as natural hosts. There are four species in this genus.

Taxonomy
The following four species are assigned to the genus:
 Anthoxanthum latent blanching virus (ALBV) (Hosts Anthoxanthum odoratum.)
 Barley stripe mosaic virus (BSMV)
 Lychnis ringspot virus (LRSV) (Hosts Silene divaricata/Lychnis divaricata, Mentha longifolia, Nicotiana benthamiana, several families of dicots,  not legumes or cereals.)
 Poa semilatent virus (PSLV) (Hosts Elymus trachycaulus, Poa palustris, several tribes of the Poaceae, barley, wheat, oat, other true cereals - no dicots. Thought to not be seed transmitted.)

Structure

Viruses in the genus Hordeivirus are non-enveloped, with rod-shaped geometries. The diameter is around 20-25 nm, with a length of 20-25 nm. Genomes are linear and segmented, tripartite or quadripartite, around 3.3kb in length. The earliest research on Hordeiviruses has been done on BSMV, and RNA sequencing shows BSMV's guide RNAs encode for seven major proteins, and suggest that this is true for the entire genus.

Life cycle
Viral replication is cytoplasmic, and is lysogenic. Entry into the host cell is achieved by penetration into the host cell. Replication follows the positive stranded RNA virus replication model. Positive stranded RNA virus transcription is the method of transcription. Translation takes place by leaky scanning. The virus exits the host cell by tripartite non-tubule guided viral movement. Plants serve as the natural host. Transmission routes are seed borne.

Hosts
Monocots, and dicots including Chenopodium spp.

References

External links
 ICTV 10th Report Virgaviridae
 Viralzone: Hordeivirus
 ICTV
 

Virgaviridae
Viral plant pathogens and diseases
Virus genera